The Huanghai Raytour (瑞途) is a light commercial vehicle (van) produced and sold by SG Automotive (曙光汽车) under the Huanghai Auto (黄海) marque from China. The Huanghai Raytour was introduced in China in 2016 with prices ranging from 168,800 yuan to 298,800 yuan.

Engine and transmission

Power of the Huanghai Raytour Cummins ISF2.8 2.8 liter turbo diesel engine producing 150 hp(110 kW)/3200rpm with a maximum torque of 360N·m/1800-2700rpm, and mated to a 5-speed manual gearbox. The exterior design is controversial as the styling is clearly a reverse engineered design based on the Volkswagen Crafter and the Mercedes Sprinter.

References

External links

Raytour
Vehicles introduced in 2016
Minibuses
Vans
Rear-wheel-drive vehicles
2010s cars
Cars of China